El Nasr Boys' School (EBS) is a PreK - Grade 12 school in Shatby, Alexandria, Egypt. Founded in 1929, it is one of the oldest schools in the city, and has more than 7,000 students each year.

History 

The school was founded in 1929 by the British while Egypt was under British occupation, as the "British Boys' School". After the Egyptian Revolution of 1952, it was renamed the El Nasr Boys' School. It was built in the Shatby area of Alexandria, between Abo Quer and Aflaton streets. Across the street is the El Nasr Girls' College. Also there is another El Nasr school in Heliopolis, Cairo. It provides primary, preparatory, secondary and IGCSE education.

Education system 

The school goes from kindergarten through high school, and offers an American Diploma and the IGCSE for boys and girls.

School anthem 

Usually, the school anthem is used only on primary stage. After that, in the preparatory and the senior stages, only the national anthem is used.

Alumni 

 Robert Bauval, Belgian author
 Ahmed Nazif, former Prime Minister of Egypt
 Amr Waked, Egyptian actor
 Islam El-Shater, Egyptian footballer
 Dr Amr Galal El Adawi, President of Beirut Arab University
 Amr Warda, Egyptian football player
 Erol Gelenbe, French-Turkish Computer Scientist and Member of several National Academies of Science and Engineering
+Adel Elmaghraby,Egyptian-American Computer Scientist and Research Director.

See also 
 Educational institutions in Alexandria
 Education in Egypt

References

External links
 El Nasr Boys' School Facebook Page

Schools in Egypt
Private schools in Alexandria
Education in Alexandria